Mykola Zaichenkov is a Ukrainian sprint canoer who competed in the late 1990s and early 2000s. He won three medals at the ICF Canoe Sprint World Championships with a gold (K-4 200 m: 2003) and two bronzes (K-2 200 m and K-4 200 m: both 2001).

References

Living people
Ukrainian male canoeists
Year of birth missing (living people)
ICF Canoe Sprint World Championships medalists in kayak